Deep River State Trail is a unit of the North Carolina state park system in Chatham, Lee, Moore, Randolph and Guilford Counties, North Carolina in the United States, and it covers  along the Deep River.  The State Trail is planned as a combination hiking trail and paddle trail along the Deep River, from Jamestown to its confluence with the Cape Fear River.  The park and trail were established by the General Assembly on August 2, 2007.  The first land acquisition for the park is known as the "Justice Lands", which are near Jordan Lake.  No part of the park is currently developed, and no trail segments have yet been designated by the North Carolina Division of Parks and Recreation.

References

External links
 
 Conservation Makes Waves on the Deep River
 The Steward – Deep River State Trail is born
 Gov. Easley signs bill authorizing Deep River State Trail
 Session Law 2007-437 established Deep River State Trail.

State parks of North Carolina
Protected areas of Chatham County, North Carolina
Protected areas of Guilford County, North Carolina
Protected areas of Moore County, North Carolina
Protected areas of Lee County, North Carolina
Protected areas of Randolph County, North Carolina
Protected areas established in 2007
Water trails